Doug Sweetland (born 1974) is an American animator and filmmaker.

As a child, Sweetland drew cartoons for the Central Pennsylvania Festival of the Arts for several years. After graduating high school in 1992, he opted to attend California Institute of the Arts and pursue his lifelong love and passion for animation.

In 1994, he decided to leave school in his final year to join Pixar. His first assignment was as an animator on Toy Story. He continued as animator on A Bug's Life  and Toy Story 2. He was nominated for an Annie Award for Outstanding Individual Achievement for Character Animation for the film.

Sweetland continued to build a reputation as one of the best animators in the business. He was awarded back-to-back Annie Awards for Outstanding Individual Achievement in Character Animation for Monsters, Inc. and Finding Nemo. He took on the lead animator role for Bud Luckey's Oscar-nominated Boundin' and worked as an animator and storyboard artist on the Oscar-winning The Incredibles. Sweetland followed this up by stepping into the supervising animator role on John Lasseter's Cars.

In 2007, Sweetland pitched a short film about a sympathetic magician who gets "dumped" by his rabbit. This eventually evolved to a more slapstick film (and a throwback to Warner Bros. classic Looney Tunes). Teddy Newton was brought on board to design the characters; it emerged as Sweetland's directorial debut. Presto was very well received by audiences and critics alike when it preceded WALL-E in theaters. It was honored in 2008 with an Academy Award nomination in the Best Animated Short Film category. It was included in the Animation Show of Shows in 2008. After finishing Presto, Sweetland then left Pixar in 2009.

On September 24, 2010, it was reported that Sweetland had been hired by Sony Pictures Animation to direct a computer-animated film adaptation of The Familiars novel series; that project has been cancelled. In January 2013, it was reported that Warner Bros. was developing the computer-animated feature film Storks under their newly created Warner Animation Group banner, conceived and written by Nicholas Stoller, with Sweetland set to direct. In April 2015, Warner Bros. announced that the film, which Sweetland co-directed with Stoller, would be released on September 23, 2016.

Filmography
Toy Story (1995) (animator)
A Bug's Life (1998) (animator)
Toy Story 2 (1999) (animator)
Monsters, Inc. (2001) (directing animator)
Finding Nemo (2003) (animator)
Boundin' (2003) (lead animator; short film)
The Incredibles (2004) (animator, storyboard artist)
Cars (2006) (supervising animator)
Presto (2008) (director, writer; short film)
Storks (2016) (director)
Pigeon Toady's Guide to Your New Baby (2016) (director; short film)

References

External links

Living people
Animators from Pennsylvania
American film directors
American storyboard artists
American animated film directors
Annie Award winners
California Institute of the Arts alumni
Pixar people
1974 births